Chlorita is a genus of true bugs belonging to the family Cicadellidae.

The genus was first described by Fieber in 1872.

The species of this genus are found in Europe.

Species:
 Chlorita paolii
 Chlorita viridula

References

Cicadellidae
Hemiptera genera